Ibrahim Okash Omar (born 18 September 1964) is a former athlete who competed internationally for Somalia. He competed at the 1984 Summer Olympics and the 1988 Summer Olympics. 

Okash was raised in Jowhar, about 25 miles from Mogadishu.

At the 1984 Games he competed in the 400 metres and finished 7th in his heat and did not advance any further. At the 1988 Summer Olympics, he advanced to the semifinals of the 800 metres. He finished eighth in the semifinals.

He competed for the University of Southern California in 1988 and 1989. In 1988, while at USC, Okash set a Pac-12 record of 1:33:92 in the 800 metres. As of 2021, Okash still held the Pac-12 record. He also ranks second in USC history with a time of 3:40:86 in the 1,500 meters.

He was later affiliated with the Santa Monica Track Club.

References

External links
 

1964 births
Living people
Olympic athletes of Somalia
USC Trojans men's track and field athletes
Athletes (track and field) at the 1984 Summer Olympics
Athletes (track and field) at the 1988 Summer Olympics
Somalian male sprinters
Somalian male middle-distance runners
People from Middle Shabelle